Daniel Grando can refer to:

 Daniel Grando (footballer) (born 1985), Brazilian footballer
 Daniel Grando (ice hockey) (born 1948), French ice hockey player